Clematis virginiana (also known as devil's darning needles, devil's hair, love vine, traveller's joy, virgin's bower, Virginia virgin's bower, wild hops, and woodbine; syn. Clematis virginiana L. var. missouriensis (Rydb.) Palmer & Steyermark  ) is a vine of the Ranunculaceae  (buttercup family) native to North America from Newfoundland to southern Manitoba down to the Gulf of Mexico.  The rationale for some of the common names is unclear, as they include examples normally applied to unrelated plants, including twining parasites (e.g. "devil's hair" for Cuscuta). The name "Love Vine" also is applied to alleged aphrodisiacs, such as Caribbean species of Cassytha, which are unrelated to Clematis, not being in the family Ranunculaceae.

Description
The leaves are opposite and pinnately compound, trifoliate (3 leaflets) that have coarse unequal teeth on the margins. It produces small dull white flowers of width  from July to September that are faintly sweetly fragrant; sometimes dioecious so that there are separate staminate (male) and pistillate (female) plants. The male plants are a little showier in flower and don't bear seed. The dry fruit is an achene with long hair as silvery gray feathery plumes attached in late August into November. It grows on the edges of the woods, moist slopes, fence rows, in thickets and on streambanks. It grows in full sun to light full shade and is very adaptable to many soils from sandy to clay, dry to draining wet, and acid to alkaline with pH range of 6.0 to 8.5. It has a deep but sparse, fibrous root system that makes it hard to transplant.(2.) Good for USDA hardiness zones of 3 to 8. Virgin's Bower is not commonly planted in gardens and landscapes in most places. It is sold by a good number of native plant nurseries and some specialty and large conventional nurseries.

What is usually sold at most every conventional nursery or garden center is the similar sweetautumn clematis, Clematis terniflora, from Japan that is much more rampant growing, that bears heavier clouds of white flowers with a stronger fragrance, that has simple leaves not compound with 3 leaflets, that as one plant self-sows around a lot, and becomes an invasive plant when escaping cultivation in North America.

It is a larval host of the clematis clearwing moth.

References

Further reading

virginiana
Vines
Flora of North America
Plants described in 1755
Taxa named by Carl Linnaeus